Klaas Willem Veering (born 26 September 1981) is a field hockey goalkeeper from the Netherlands, who won the silver medal with the Dutch national team at the 2004 Summer Olympics in Athens. There he was the stand-in for first choice Guus Vogels.

The goalie made his debut on 23 February 2003 in a friendly match in and against Australia. He played for Amsterdam, with whom he won the title in the Dutch League (Hoofdklasse)four times (2003, 2004, 2011 and 2014).

External links
 
 Profile on Athens 2004-website

1981 births
Living people
Dutch male field hockey players
Olympic field hockey players of the Netherlands
Olympic silver medalists for the Netherlands
Field hockey players at the 2004 Summer Olympics
Sportspeople from Leiden
Olympic medalists in field hockey
Medalists at the 2004 Summer Olympics
2006 Men's Hockey World Cup players
20th-century Dutch people
21st-century Dutch people